Veiko Belials (born 20 July 1966 in Tapa) is an Estonian writer, poet, translator.

In 1991, he graduated from Estonian Academy of Agriculture, studying forestry. In 2003, he graduated from Tartu University, studying to be a teacher of technical disciplines.

Since 2000, he has been a teacher at Luua Forestry School.

He is a member of Estonian Writers' Union.

Works
He is published five poetry collection, several science fiction books and one children book.

References

1966 births
Living people
Estonian male poets
21st-century Estonian poets
Estonian science fiction writers
Estonian children's writers
Estonian women children's writers
Estonian translators
University of Tartu alumni
People from Tapa, Estonia